A common name,  in the nomenclature of biology, is a name of a taxon or organism based on the normal language of everyday life.

Common name may also refer to:
 Common name (chemistry) (also: trivial name), non-systematic name for a chemical
 Common noun in linguistics, noun that refers to a class of entities rather than a unique entity
 CN (or "common name") in cryptography, part of an X.509 attribute certificate

See also
 Generic name (disambiguation)